Sheikh Hassan Barsame was a Somali cleric and religious scholar. He was best known for having led a revolt against Italian colonial forces after World War I.

Early life

Barsame was born 1853 in Ubaadi, a village 68 km west of Jowhar in the Middle Shebelle region of southern Somalia. He hailed from the Barsame tribe, a division of the larger Gaalje'el clans.

After memorizing the Quran during his youth, Barsame sought to further his religious education.

He traveled to Mecca to perform the Hajj. Barsame stayed there for three years, meeting along the way Sheikh Mohammed Salih, the leader of the Salihiyah. Barsame thereafter joined Salih's movement.

Military leadership
Sheikh Barsame's forces owned an estimated 16,000 rifles. In 1905, they stopped an attempted Ethiopian expansion into southern Somalia during the battle of Gumar Sheel.

The Sheikh and his men also fought various battles against Italian troops, including:

 Buloburde
  El Dhere
 Hilweyne
 Juliyale
 Harerile
 Gumarsheel
 Lafoole

See also
Mohammed Abdullah Hassan

References

20th-century Somalian people
Italian Somaliland
Ethnic Somali people
1853 births
1927 deaths